The Trofeo Emma Cuervo is an annual football tournament held in Ribadeo, Lugo, Spain, held every year since 1952. It is organised by Ribadeo FC.

History

Winners

References

External links 
 RSSSF Archive

Spanish football friendly trophies
Football in Galicia (Spain)
1952 establishments in Spain
Recurring sporting events established in 1952